The 2018 Major League Baseball (MLB) First-Year Player Draft began on June 4, 2018. The draft assigned amateur baseball players to MLB teams. The draft order was determined based on the reverse order of the 2017 MLB season final standings. In addition, compensation picks were distributed for players who did not sign from the 2017 MLB Draft and for teams who lose qualifying free agents. The first 43 picks, including the first round and compensatory picks, were broadcast by MLB Network on June 4. The remainder of the draft was streamed on MLB.com on June 5 and 6.

With a tie for the worst record in the 2017 MLB season at 64–98, the Detroit Tigers received the first overall pick ahead of the San Francisco Giants via a tiebreaker. The Detroit Tigers selected Casey Mize with the first overall pick in the draft. There were a total of 40 rounds in the draft, with 1,214 players selected.

On September 9, 2019, the Chicago Cubs promoted Nico Hoerner to the big leagues, making him the first player to reach the MLB in this draft.

First round selections

Compensatory Round

Competitive Balance Round A

Other notable selections

Notes
Compensation picks

References

Further reading

External links
2018 Major League Baseball draft Official Site

Major League Baseball draft
Draft
Major League Baseball draft
Major League Baseball draft
Baseball in New Jersey
Events in New Jersey
Sports in Hudson County, New Jersey
Secaucus, New Jersey